Hales Green Common is an area of open access common land situated in South Norfolk, England. Hales Green Common has been described by Norfolk Wildlife Trust as neutral grassland. In addition to being one of six registered commons in South Norfolk Hales Green is also a designated county wildlife site (CWS)

References 

Geography of Norfolk
South Norfolk